Howick Farmhouse, in the hamlet of Howick, near Itton, Monmouthshire is a farmhouse dating from the mid-16th century. It is a Grade II* listed building. Its associated barns and stable block have their own Grade II listings.

History
Sir Cyril Fox and Lord Raglan date the house to 1540–1550 in their three-volume guide Monmouthshire Houses. It was extended in the 17th century, and altered in the 19th century. It remains a private house and had further, minor, modifications in the 20th century.

Architecture and description
The architectural historian John Newman describes the farmhouse and its buildings as "a fine group". Cadw records the farmhouse as a "a very good 16th century yeoman's house". The house is built entirely of stone, an approach to construction then rare in Monmouthshire, although common in England. It is built to a two-room, two-storey plan, with a slate roof. The building is notable for its impressive Tudor windows and a "rich" range of interior period features. 
 
The farmhouse is a Grade II* listed building. Its two barns and the associated stable block have their own Grade II listings.

Notes

References 
 
 

Grade II* listed buildings in Monmouthshire
Farmhouses in Wales
Grade II* listed houses in Wales